Robert Machemer (16 March 1933 in Münster – 23 December 2009 in Durham, North Carolina) was a German-American ophthalmologist, ophthalmic surgeon, and inventor. He is sometimes called the "father of modern retinal surgery."

Helmut Machemer,  Robert's father, was an ophthalmologist who died in Ukraine on 18 May 1942, leaving a widow and three small sons. In 1953, when Robert Machemer completed his Abitur, he worked for six months in a steel mill to partially finance his medical school education. He studied medicine at the University of Münster, where he received his MD, and the University of Freiburg, where his received his Promotierung in 1959. From 1962 to 1966 he was an assistant in the University Eye Clinic of Göttingen. In 1966 he received a two-year NATO fellowship and moved, with his wife and three-year-old daughter, to Miami to work at the Bascom Palmer Eye Institute. He remained at the Bascom Palmer Eye Institute until 1978, when he became the chair of Duke University Medical School's Department of Ophthalmology, serving in that capacity until 1991 and had his retirement as professor emeritus in 1998.

Machemer and Helmut Buettner created the vitreous infusion suction cutter (VISC), an instrument that made possible endoillumination and safe removal of the vitreous through extremely small cuts in the pars plana. On 20 April 1970 Machemer and his surgical team performed the first pars plana vitrectomy. (Who performed the first pars plana vitrectomy might be in dispute due to claims of priority by Japanese ophthalmologists.)

He established an animal model of retinal detachment and used this model to study proliferative vitreoretinopathy (PVR), which Machemer originally called massive periretinal proliferation.

Awards and honors
1981 — Albrecht von Graefe Prize of the Deutsche Ophthalmologische Gesellschaft (German Ophthalmological Society)
1993 — Ernst Jung Prize
1996 — Howe Medal of the American Ophthalmological Society
1997 — Helen Keller Prize for Vision Research of the Helen Keller Foundation
1998 — Gonin Medal
2000 — Induction into the ASCRS Ophthalmology Hall of Fame of the American Society of Cataract and Refractive Surgery
2003 —  Laureate Recognition Award of the American Academy of Ophthalmology
2010 — Robert Machemer Foundation established
2016- Retina Hall of Fame--posthumously

Selected publications

References

External links
Robert Machemer's Early Vitrectomy with VISC, 1972 on Vimeo

1933 births
2009 deaths
German ophthalmologists
American ophthalmologists
People from Münster
German emigrants to the United States